The 1969–70 season was the 61st year of football played by Dundee United, and covers the period from 1 July 1969 to 30 June 1970. United finished in fifth place in the First Division.

Match results
Dundee United played a total of 44 competitive matches during the 1969–70 season.

Legend

All results are written with Dundee United's score first.
Own goals in italics

First Division

Scottish Cup

League Cup

Inter-Cities Fairs Cup

References

See also
 1969–70 in Scottish football

Dundee United F.C. seasons
Dundee United